The Vestingcross is a cyclo-cross race held in Hulst, Netherlands. From 2017 to 2020 it was part of the Ethias Cross, formerly known as the Brico Cross. From the season 2020-2021 it is part of the Worldcup. Due to the COVID-19 pandemic in 2021 the race was held on an alternative location in Perkpolder and not on and around the city walls in Hulst as usual.

Past winners

References

 Men's results
 Women's results

Cycle races in the Netherlands
Cyclo-cross races
Recurring sporting events established in 2016
2016 establishments in the Netherlands